In enzymology, a dihydrolipoyllysine-residue (2-methylpropanoyl)transferase is an enzyme that catalyzes the chemical reaction

2-methylpropanoyl-CoA + enzyme N6-(dihydrolipoyl)lysine  CoA + enzyme N6-(S-[2-methylpropanoyl]dihydrolipoyl)lysine

Thus, the two substrates of this enzyme are 2-methylpropanoyl-CoA and enzyme N6-(dihydrolipoyl)lysine, whereas its two products are CoA and [[enzyme N6-(S-[2-methylpropanoyl]dihydrolipoyl)lysine]].

This enzyme belongs to the family of transferases, specifically those acyltransferases transferring groups other than aminoacyl groups.  The systematic name of this enzyme class is 2-methylpropanoyl-CoA:enzyme-N6-(dihydrolipoyl)lysine S-(2-methylpropanoyl)transferase. Other names in common use include dihydrolipoyl transacylase, enzyme-dihydrolipoyllysine:2-methylpropanoyl-CoA, S-(2-methylpropanoyl)transferase, 2-methylpropanoyl-CoA:enzyme-6-N-(dihydrolipoyl)lysine, and S-(2-methylpropanoyl)transferase.  This enzyme participates in valine, leucine and isoleucine degradation.

Structural studies

References

 
 
 
 

EC 2.3.1
Enzymes of known structure